Christine Warden (née Ηοwell; born 26 December 1950) is an English former 400 metres hurdler. She finished fourth representing Europe at the 1979 IAAF World Cup and reached the 1980 World Championship final. Her 400 m hurdles best of 56.06 seconds set in 1979, is a former British record and still ranks her in the UK all-time top 20.

International competitions

National titles
2 AAA Championships (1979, 1981)
2 UK Championships (1977, 1979)

References

1950 births
Living people
British female hurdlers
English female hurdlers
World Athletics Championships athletes for Great Britain